Alfred Niepieklo (11 June 1927 — 2 April 2014) was a German footballer who played as a  forward.

Niepieklo played for Borussia Dortmund making 183 appearances and scoring 107 goals.

External links
Football: Alfred Niepieklo - Footballdatabase.eu.

German footballers
Borussia Dortmund players
1927 births
2014 deaths
Association football forwards
People from Castrop-Rauxel
Sportspeople from Münster (region)
Footballers from North Rhine-Westphalia